Gol Zard (also Romanized as Gol-e Zard and Gul-i-Zard) is a village in Yusefvand Rural District, in the Central District of Selseleh County, Lorestan Province, Iran. At the 2006 census, its population was 255, in 53 families.

References 

Towns and villages in Selseleh County